Van Bronckhorst is a Dutch surname.

It may refer to:

 Giovanni van Bronckhorst (born 1975), Dutch former footballer
 Jan Gerritsz van Bronckhorst (1603–1661), Dutch painter
 Johannes van Bronckhorst (1648–1727), Dutch painter
 Pieter van Bronckhorst (1588–1661), Dutch painter

Surnames of Dutch origin